Horikawaella is a genus of liverworts belonging to the family Jungermanniaceae.

The genus name of Horikawaella is in honour of Yoshiwo Horikawa (1902-1976), who was a Japanese botanist (Mycology and Bryology), from the Hiroshima University.

The genus was circumscribed by Sinske Hattori and Tairoko Amakawa in Misc. Bryol. Lichenol. vol.5 on page 164 in 1971.

Species known:
Horikawaella grosse-verrucosa 
Horikawaella subacuta

References

Jungermanniales
Jungermanniales genera